The 2006 Formula Renault 2.0 Northern European Cup was the inaugural Formula Renault 2.0 Northern European Cup season. The season began at Oschersleben on 22 April and finished on 17 September at the Salzburgring, after sixteen races.

Motopark Academy driver Filipe Albuquerque won the NEC championship title, having won four races during the season. Runner-up Chris van der Drift amassed four race wins too. His JD Motorsport team-mate Xavier Maassen completed the top three with two wins.

Drivers and teams

Race calendar and results

Standings

Notes

References

External links
 Official website of the Formula Renault 2.0 NEC championship

NEC
Formula Renault 2.0 NEC
Formula Renault 2.0 NEC
Renault NEC